The acronym OUC can refer to

Organization Unit Code (see Organizational Unit)
Oslo University College, Oslo, Norway
Okanagan University College, Kelowna, British Columbia, Canada
Orlando Utilities Commission, Orlando, Florida, US
Ocean University of China, Qingdao, Shandong, China
Otaru University of Commerce, Otaru, Hokkaidō, Japan
Open University of Cyprus, Lefkosia (Nicosia), Cyprus
Slang term that stands for "Oh, you see?" the second person form of "Oh, I see."